Paula Kania-Choduń and Julia Lohoff were the defending champions but chose not to participate.

Mariam Bolkvadze and Samantha Murray Sharan won the title, defeating Susan Bandecchi and Simona Waltert in the final, 6–3, 7–5.

Seeds

Draw

Draw

References
Main Draw

Burg-Wächter Ladies Open - Doubles